The Ujjaini Express is a bi-weekly train service, connecting Ujjain Junction railway station of Ujjain, the Hindu mythological and historical city in the Central Indian state Madhya Pradesh with Dehradun, the capital of Uttarakhand.

The number provided for this train is 14309 From Ujjain to Dehradun and 14310 From Dehradun to Ujjain. This service is the only express train service originating from Ujjain Junction. The train runs on bi-weekly basis sharing rakes of Indore - Dehradun Express. It additionally consist of 2 more sleeper coaches to maintain reservation quota for Ujjain People as this train is the only connection of holy city Ujjaini with other holy city Haridwar.

Service

The 14309/Ujjaini Express has an average speed of 43 km/hr and covers 1243 km in 28 hrs 40 mins. 14310/Ujjaini Express has an average speed of 46 km/hr and 1243 km in 27 hrs 15 mins.

Route & Halts 

The train has standard ICF rakes with max speed of 110 kmph. The important halts of the train are:

Coach composite

The train consists of 13 coaches :

 1 AC II Tier
 1 AC III Tier
 5 Sleeper Coaches
 4 General
 2 Second-class Luggage/parcel van

Traction

Both trains are hauled by a Ratlam Loco Shed based WDM 3A diesel locomotive from Ujjain to Dehradun and vice versa.

Direction Reversal

Train Reverses its direction only at:

Rake Sharing 

The train shares its rake with 14317/14318 Indore - Dehradun Express

See also

 Ujjain Junction
 Indore - Dehradun Express

Notes

References

External links 

 14309/Ujjaini Express
 14310/Ujjaini Express

Transport in Ujjain
Trains from Dehradun
Named passenger trains of India
Rail transport in Madhya Pradesh
Rail transport in Uttar Pradesh
Rail transport in Rajasthan
Rail transport in Haryana
Rail transport in Delhi
Railway services introduced in 1991
Express trains in India